The Kota Bharu railway station (also known as Kota Bharu Freight Yard) is a Malaysian train station stationed at the north eastern side of and named after the town of Kota Bharu, Perak. But prior to the Rawang–Ipoh Electrified Double Tracking project, the station has turned into a freight yard. So, people who stay in Kota Bharu will no longer get the passenger services. The nearest passenger station is the Batu Gajah railway station.

External links
 Kota Bharu (Perak) Railway Station

KTM ETS railway stations
Railway stations in Perak